The Nebraska Cornhuskers football team competes as part of the NCAA Division I Football Bowl Subdivision, representing the University of Nebraska–Lincoln in the West Division of the Big Ten. Nebraska plays its home games at Memorial Stadium, where it has sold out every game since 1962.

Nebraska is among the most storied programs in college football history and has the eighth-most all-time victories among FBS teams. Nebraska claims forty-six conference championships and five national championships (1970, 1971, 1994, 1995, and 1997), and has won six other national championships the school does not claim. NU's 1971 and 1995 title-winning teams are considered among the best in college football history. Famous Cornhuskers include Heisman Trophy winners Johnny Rodgers, Mike Rozier, and Eric Crouch, who join twenty-two other Cornhuskers in the College Football Hall of Fame. Notable among these are players Bob Brown, Guy Chamberlin, Tommie Frazier, Rich Glover, Dave Rimington, and Will Shields, and coaches Bob Devaney and Tom Osborne.

The program's first extended period of success came just after the turn of the century. Between 1900 and 1916, Nebraska had five undefeated seasons and completed a stretch of thirty-four consecutive games without a loss, still a program record. Despite a span of twenty-one conference championships in thirty-three seasons, the Cornhuskers didn't experience major national success until Bob Devaney was hired in 1962. In eleven seasons as head coach, Devaney won two national championships, eight conference titles, and coached twenty-two All-Americans, but perhaps his most lasting achievement was the hiring of Tom Osborne as offensive coordinator in 1969. Osborne was named Devaney's successor in 1973, and over the next twenty-five years established himself as one of the best coaches in college football history with his trademark I-form offense and revolutionary strength, conditioning, and nutrition programs. Following Osborne's retirement in 1997, Nebraska has cycled through five head coaches, with Mickey Joseph serving as interim head coach following the firing of Scott Frost.

On November 26, 2022 Nebraska announced the hiring of Matt Rhule to become the next head coach of the Cornhusker football program.

History

Seasons

Conference affiliations

 Independent (1890–91; 1898–1906; 1919–20) 
 Western Interstate University Football Association (1892–97)  
 Big Eight (1907–18; 1921–95)
 Missouri Valley Intercollegiate Athletic Association (1907–18; 1921–27) 
 Big Six (1928–47) 
 Big Seven (1948–59) 
 Big 12 (1996–2010) 
 Big Ten (2011–present)

Head coaches

Nebraska has had 31 head coaches in the program's history, with five others coaching at least one game on a non-permanent basis. The current head coach is Matt Rhule.

Six past Nebraska head coaches have been inducted into the College Football Hall of Fame: Edward N. Robinson, Fielding H. Yost, Dana X. Bible, Biff Jones, Bob Devaney, and Tom Osborne. Osborne is the program's all-time leader in most major categories; his .836 career winning percentage is fourth-highest in major college football history. Thirteen Nebraska coaches have won a conference championship at the school, and Devaney and Osborne combined to win five national titles.

Championships

National championships
Nebraska has won five consensus national championships from NCAA-designated major selectors.

Unclaimed national championships

Nebraska has been awarded six other national championships from NCAA-designated major selectors that the school does not claim. Major selectors for each are shown below.

† Co-champions

‡ Claimed by both Nebraska  and Oklahoma due to a dispute over Oklahoma's forfeiture of games

Bowl games

Nebraska has played in fifty-three bowl games, including an NCAA-record thirty-five straight from 1969 to 2003, with a record of 26–27.

Memorial Stadium

Memorial Stadium, known as The Sea of Red, has been home of the Cornhuskers since 1923 and is the location of an ongoing NCAA-record 389-game  sellout streak. The sellout streak dates back to 1962, Bob Devaney's first season at Nebraska. The stadium becomes the "third-largest city in Nebraska" on game days, as its capacity exceeds that of every Nebraska town except for Omaha and Lincoln.

The stadium has undergone a series of expansion since 1923, bringing the official capacity to 85,458. The largest crowd in Memorial Stadium history occurred on September 20, 2014, a Nebraska win over Miami with an announced attendance of 91,585.

Three statues sit outside of the stadium. The oldest, unveiled in 1997, depicts six Nebraska defenders tackling a ball carrier. Creator Fred Hoppe said, "the monument displays the sense of pride that Nebraskans have for their football team." In 2006, Hoppe created a statue of Tom Osborne with his arm around quarterback Brook Berringer, which is located outside the Osborne Athletic Complex. On August 30, 2013, a bronze statue of Bob Devaney was unveiled at the main entrance of the newly remodeled east stadium. Sculptor Joe Putjenter also created the Tunnel Walk gates inside the stadium.

Before the construction of Memorial Stadium, Nebraska played its home games at Antelope Park and Nebraska Field.

Traditions
Tunnel Walk

Since 1994, Nebraska's home games have opened with the "Tunnel Walk". Just before kickoff, Memorial Stadium plays "Sirius" as the Huskers take the field from the northwest tunnel. Immediately before the Tunnel Walk, half of Memorial Stadium yells "Husker" in unison, while the other half response with "Power."

Balloon release

At every home game since the 1930s, fans have released red helium balloons when the Huskers score their first points. In 2012, a global helium shortage threatened the tradition, but the university allowed for a limited number of balloon releases throughout the season. The tradition returned to normal the following year. In 2022, citing another global helium shortage, athletic director Trev Alberts put the tradition on hold for the year.

Walk-on program

Nebraska has a long-standing walk-on program, designed to attract student-athletes who did not receive scholarship offers. NU accepted its first walk-on in the early 1960s, and Tom Osborne began an official program in 1973 after the NCAA reduced the number of scholarships schools could offer. The size and stature of the program means that Nebraska's rosters are often unusually large; NU had 141 players on its 1996 Fiesta Bowl team, while opponent Florida had only ninety-four. Osborne credited his walk-ons with providing flexibility to better scout future opponents. Unlike some other schools, Nebraska's walk-ons have the same access to training facilities and academic counseling as those with scholarships. Six Nebraska walk-ons have become All-Americans and twenty-nine have played in the National Football League.

Uniform history

Helmets

Nebraska's first helmet was red with a single white stripe, later changed to plain white with a black number on the side. From 1967 to 1969, the helmet featured a red, offset "NU" on each side. In 1970, this was changed to the now-familiar single "N", although a few "NU" helmets remained as late as 1972. The change was necessitated due to a shortage of "U" stickers, and when the program claimed its first national championship, the single N remained. The helmet design has remained essentially unchanged since, with the exception of a facemask switch from grey to red in 1982.

Jerseys

The Huskers wore full shoulder stripes in the late 1960s and early 1970s, but these were gradually phased out as mesh and tearaway jerseys became popular. From 1980 to 1983, Nebraska's jerseys featured only a block "N" on the sleeves. In 1984, stripes and TV numbers were permanently re-added, although both have decreased in size as jersey sleeves have shortened. A patch was added to the left shoulder to commemorate the 100th season of Nebraska football in 1989; it remained the following season and was altered to read "Nebraska Football: A Winning Tradition." Players' last names first appeared on jerseys for road games and bowl games in the late 1970s, but home jerseys remained nameless except for seniors playing their final home game. In 1990, last names were permanently affixed to all jerseys.

Nebraska's defense has been referred to as the "Blackshirts" since the 1960s, a reference to the black jerseys worn by starting defensive players during practice. Depictions of the Blackshirts often include a skull and crossbones. The tradition originated when Bob Devaney had the defense use contrasting jerseys to offset the red worn by the offense in practice.

Pants

The team traditionally wears white pants at home and red on the road, although there have been exceptions. Nebraska first donned red pants with red jerseys for its 1986 contest with Oklahoma; the combination was unofficially retired after a late Nebraska loss. Nebraska wore all-white uniforms for the first in the 1991 Florida Citrus Bowl, a 45–21 loss to Georgia Tech. NU used the white-on-white combination for its first three road games in 1992, but lost two of them, including an upset loss to Iowa State. The "surrender suits", as they became known, were not seen again for over a decade. In 2007, the white-on-white combination was worn for Bill Callahan's final game as head coach, an embarrassing loss to Colorado. Nebraska again donned all-white in 2014 to contrast Fresno State's all-red uniforms. NU won 55–19 and wore white pants in three more road games that season.

From 1968 through 1994, Nebraska's pants had two stripes down each side. These were removed prior to the 1995 season, and the pants remained stripe-less until 2001. In 2002, Nebraska experimented with large side panels on its jersey and pants, and wore all-white in every road game. The changes were unpopular among fans, and Nebraska quickly reverted most changes, which included the permanent return of pant stripes. When Scott Frost became head coach in 2018, pant stripes were again removed, as a tribute to the uniform style from Frost's playing career.

Alternate uniforms

Nebraska wore throwback uniforms for the first time in 2009, to honor Memorial Stadium's 300th consecutive sellout. In 2012, Nebraska and Wisconsin played in the first "Adidas Unrivaled" game; Both schools' uniforms featured block letters instead of front numbers and proved to be hugely unpopular. The following year, Nebraska wore black jerseys with white stencil font numbers against UCLA. In 2014, Nebraska wore an all-red uniform featuring black metallic stripes on the jersey and pants, and used a similar design for all-black and all-white uniforms over the next two years.

In 2017, Nebraska wore throwback uniforms to celebrate the 20th anniversary of the school's 1997 national championship team. Unlike previous years, this design was well received. Nebraska again wore throwback uniforms in 2018 to honor the 100th anniversary of the end of World War I. Nebraska wore Blackshirt-themed alternate uniforms in 2019, which featured a black jersey and a Blackshirts logo on both sleeves. Frost suggested this iteration may be a permanent design, to be worn after Nebraska's defense plays particularly well.

Adidas has been Nebraska's official shoe and uniform sponsor since 1996. In 2017, the school and sponsor agreed to a record-setting eleven-year, $128 million apparel deal.

Rivalries

Colorado

The rivalry between Nebraska and Colorado, one-sided for much of its history, gained traction with Colorado's resurgence in the 1990s. The teams have met 71 times, with the series dating back to 1898, a 23–10 Nebraska win. The Cornhuskers lead the series 49–20–2. The rivalry began when Colorado joined the Big Eight in 1947; they played in the same conference as Nebraska until 2010. A bison head named Mr. Chip was presented to the winning team throughout the 1950s, but this exchange ended when Colorado misplaced the trophy in 1961. The teams have not played annually since both programs exited the Big 12 in 2011, but future non-conference games are planned for 2023 and 2024.

Iowa

The Iowa–Nebraska rivalry debuted in 1891, a 22–0 Iowa win. Since 2011, the game is held annually the Friday after Thanksgiving. Also, the game was named the Heroes Game, and the winner keeps the Heroes Trophy. The teams have met 53 times, with the Cornhuskers leading the series 30–20–3. Nebraska holds the trophy after defeating the Hawkeyes in 2022. They will meet next on November 23, 2023.

Kansas

Nebraska and Kansas share a natural border rivalry and maintained the longest non-interrupted rivalry in college football history at 105 years. The teams have met 117 times, with the series dating back to 1892, a 12–0 Kansas win. The Cornhuskers lead the series 91–23–3, which includes 36 consecutive victories from 1969 to 2004. Since Nebraska's move to the Big Ten in 2011, the series has been dormant. No future games are scheduled.

Kansas State

Nebraska and Kansas State were conference rivals from 1913 to 2010. With only 135 miles separating the schools, they were the nearest cross-border rivals in the Big Eight and Big 12 conferences. The teams have met 95 times, with the series dating back to 1911, a 59–0 Nebraska win. Nebraska leads the series 78–15–2, which includes 29 consecutive victories from 1969 to 1997. Since Nebraska's move to the Big Ten in 2011, the series has been dormant. No future games are scheduled.

The 1939 game was televised in Manhattan, Kansas, making it the second televised college football game. The 1992 contest was held in Tokyo as the Coca-Cola Classic.

Miami (FL)

Nebraska's series with Miami is among the most significant "bowl rivalries" in college football. The teams have met twelve times, with the series dating back to 1951, a 19–7 Miami win. The series is tied, 6–6. No future game is yet scheduled.

The rivalry's most notable game is the 1984 Orange Bowl. Top-ranked Nebraska scored with seconds remaining to make the game 31–30, but NU head coach Tom Osborne opted to try for a two-point conversion instead of an extra point, even though a tie would have given Nebraska the national championship. Miami won the game and its first national title.

Minnesota

The $5 Bits of Broken Chair Trophy has been awarded to the winner of the Minnesota–Nebraska game since 2014. The teams have met 61 times, dating back to 1900, a 20–12 Minnesota win. The Golden Gophers lead the series 34–25–2. Minnesota holds the trophy after defeating the Cornhuskers in 2022. The teams play annually and will meet next on August 31, 2023.

Missouri

The Victory Bell (also known as the Missouri–Nebraska Bell) has been awarded to the winner of the Missouri–Nebraska game since 1927. The teams have met 104 times, with the series dating back to 1892, a 1–0 NU win when Missouri forfeited to protest the presence of African-American George Flippin on Nebraska's roster. The Cornhuskers lead the series 65–36–3. Nebraska holds the Victory Bell after defeating the Tigers in 2010. Since Nebraska's move to the Big Ten in 2011, the series has been dormant. No future games are scheduled.

Oklahoma

Nebraska and Oklahoma has long been considered one of the great college football rivalries. The teams have met 87 times dating back to 1912, a 13–9 Nebraska win. The Sooners lead the series 46–38–3. Since Nebraska's move to the Big Ten in 2011, the series was dormant until 2021 when Oklahoma beat Nebraska 23–16 in Norman. Future non-conference games are scheduled for 2029 and 2030. Notably, the 2021 game in Norman marked the 50th anniversary of Nebraska's 35–31 victory over Oklahoma in the "Game of the Century".

Nebraska dominated the series until 1942, going 16–3–3 in the first twenty-two meetings. The Sooners then won sixteen consecutive games, the longest streak in the series. Nebraska's 1959 win both ended the Cornhuskers' drought against the Sooners and snapped Oklahoma's 74-game conference win streak. Nebraska won the "Game of the Century" in 1971, of which Dave Kindred of The Courier-Journal wrote, "They can quit playing now, they have played the perfect game." Oklahoma won every matchup from 1972 to 1977, a streak that ended in 1978, when Nebraska upset No. 1 Oklahoma; less than two months later, OU won a rematch in the Orange Bowl. Nebraska controlled the 1990s, including a 69–7 win in 1997, the largest margin of victory in series history. When the Big 12 was formed in 1996, the schools no longer played annually, ending a stretch of 68 consecutive years they had met. The teams met for the last time as conference opponents in the 2010 Big 12 Championship Game, when Oklahoma defeated Nebraska 23–20.

The two programs combined to win 74 of 89 Big Eight championships, 41 by Nebraska and 33 by Oklahoma. The teams played eighteen times when both were ranked in the AP Poll top ten, and nine times when both were in the top five.

Texas

Nebraska and Texas were conference rivals from 1996 to 2010. The teams have met fourteen times dating back to 1933, a 26–0 Nebraska win. Texas leads the series 10–4. Since Nebraska's move to the Big Ten in 2011, the series has been dormant. No future games are scheduled.

In the first-ever Big 12 Championship game, unranked Texas upset two-time defending national champion Nebraska. In the 2009 Big 12 Championship Game Nebraska's own upset bid was spoiled when a last-second Texas field goal gave the Longhorns the win and a spot in the national championship game.

Wisconsin

The Freedom Trophy has been awarded to the winner of the Nebraska–Wisconsin game since 2014. The teams have met fifteen times, with the series dating back to 1901, an 18–0 Wisconsin win. The Badgers lead the series 11–4. Wisconsin holds the Freedom Trophy after defeating the Cornhuskers in 2022. The teams play annually and will meet next on November 18, 2023.

Honors and awards

Individual award finalists
Winners in bold.

College Football Hall of Fame

Twenty-six former Nebraska coaches and players have been inducted into the College Football Hall of Fame.

Retired numbers and jerseys
Nebraska has retired the number of three players and the jersey of seventeen others. Rodgers permitted his No. 20 to be worn by his son Terry, from 1986 to 1990. No. 20 was also worn by Marlon Lucky and Michael Booker

Retired numbers

Retired jerseys 
Jerseys retired but numbers available to be worn:

All-Americans

Academic All-Americans

Nebraska leads the nation in Academic All-America selections, both in football and across all sports. Nebraska boasts seventy CoSIDA First-Team and 108 overall Academic All-America selections, both tops in the nation. The list includes fifteen Huskers that have been named first team Academic All-Americans twice in their careers. The Huskers also lead the nation with a total of 330 Academic All-Americans across all sports.

Nebraska has four players that have been selected as a First Team Academic All-American by entities other than CoSIDA: Don Fricke (1960), Pat Clare (1960), Jim Osberg (1965), and Tony Jeter (1965).

Cornhuskers in the NFL

Pro Football Hall of Fame
Five Nebraska players have been enshrined in the Pro Football Hall of Fame:

Cornhuskers in the NFL

There are twenty-seven Huskers on NFL rosters, along with five coaches.

Future opponents

As a member of the Big Ten's West division, Nebraska faces Illinois, Iowa, Minnesota, Northwestern, Purdue, and Wisconsin annually, with three other games against Big Ten East opponents and three games against non-conference opponents.

See also
 College football national championships in NCAA Division I FBS

References

External links

 

 
American football teams established in 1890
Cornhuskers